Motor Mania is a top-down, vertically scrolling racing game written by John Fitzpatrick for the Commodore 64 and published by UMI in 1982, the year the system was released.

Gameplay

The player drives an old-style racing car through different types of tracks avoiding enemy drivers, obstacles on the road such as nails, oil, broken glass, boulders and a fire engine at a crossroad. The game has 9 levels of difficulty.

References

External links

Motor Mania at Gamebase 64

1982 video games
Commodore 64 games
Commodore 64-only games
Top-down racing video games
Video games developed in the United Kingdom